County Route 66 (CR 66) is an east–west numbered road in San Bernardino County, California. The entire route is part of the former U.S. Route 66 (US 66), connecting towns that were bypassed by Interstate 40 (I-40) such as Oro Grande and Amboy. It is the only numbered county route in San Bernardino County.

Route description

The route is part of the California Route Marker Program. CR 66 begins at its western terminus, on the National Trails Highway at the intersection of 1st Street in unincorporated Oro Grande, near the Victorville city limits. From there, it heads north towards Barstow where it becomes Main Street headed eastbound. After an overlap with Interstate 15 Business (I-15 BL), it continues south to the I-40 interchange, where it runs concurrently with I-40 east for  before splitting from the freeway at the Nebo Street exit. At that junction, CR 66 runs parallel to I-40 all the way to Ludlow, but then turns southeast towards Amboy Crater National Natural Landmark and the town of Amboy. It then heads back towards I-40, crossing paths with the freeway again at Fenner, before heading east on Goffs Road to the junction with US 95, where it terminates.

At  in length, CR 66 is the longest county route in California, and it is even longer than some Interstate highways.

The CR 66 sign program began in San Bernardino County in June 2011, defining the route from just north of I-15 in Victorville to US 95 northwest of Needles. Although the route officially stops short of the Victorville city limits, there has been signage for the route within that city.

In 2012, the county announced an extension to the sign program which would sign the route through Needles.

History

CR 66 originally was part of the historic US 66, established in 1926. California decommissioned this highway in 1979, and in 1985, it was decommissioned nationally. In 2011, San Bernardino County Supervisor Brad Mitzlefelt proposed Resolution 63, which would establish a county route with the number 66, as a tribute to the original "Mother Road". Route markers were first installed in September 2011, upon passage of the resolution, which also allowed the possibility of the route being extended in the future along other parts of old US 66 in San Bernardino County. In May 2012, the County Board of Supervisors designated CR 66 a County Scenic Highway.

As of 2014, CR 66 has been closed east of Chambless due to bridge failure. No known date 
of reopening is known as of 2022

As of 2022, CR 66 has been closed west of Amboy to Ludlow due to over 100 timber bridge failures.

Major junctions

See also

References

External links

 California Highways

Roads in San Bernardino County, California
066
U.S. Route 66 in California